Three steamships operated by Rowland & Marwood Ltd, Whitby were named Stakesby:

, in service 1886–91, when sold
, in service until 1929, when sold to Sweden
, in service until 1940, when torpedoed and later sank; salvaged in 1942 and rebuilt as Empire Derwent

See also
 – launched at Whitby and foundered 1846

Ship names